Erika Leigh Henningsen (born August 13, 1992) is an American actress and singer. She is best known for her work on Broadway and for originating the role of Cady Heron in the 2018 Tony-nominated musical Mean Girls, for which she received an Outer Critics Circle Award nomination.

Early life and education
Henningsen was born and raised in Moraga, California. She is the youngest of three daughters born to Phil and Marybeth Henningsen.

Henningsen started in theatre after her parents recognized her passion for "talking and being in front of people" from a young age. At the age of seven, her interest in theatre was piqued after reading the poem “The Turkey Shot out of the Oven” and hearing the audience's positive response to her performance. When she was 14 years old, Henningsen was cast in a local production of Grey Gardens and has stated in interviews that after performing in this production, she knew she wanted to pursue musical theatre as a career.

Henningsen graduated from Campolindo High School in 2010 and then studied at the University of Michigan, earning a BFA in musical theatre in 2014. During her undergraduate years, she also studied at the Royal Academy of Dramatic Art in London through the NYU London program. Henningsen was selected as the winner of the 2014 Alan Eisenberg Award Scholarship, an award given to a University of Michigan graduating senior in recognition of "outstanding talent and career potential" in musical theatre.

Career
In 2010, at the age of 17, Henningsen was cast in her first professional production as Penny Pingleton in Hairspray at the Woodminster Amphitheater in Oakland, California.

In November 2014, she made her New York Philharmonic debut as Kim Ravenal in a staged concert production of Kern and Hammerstein's Show Boat. A live taping of the production later aired on PBS on October 16, 2015.

Later that year, Henningsen starred as Beth in the musical Diner, based on Barry Levinson’s 1982 film of the same name with music and lyrics by Sheryl Crow. The musical, directed and choreographed by Kathleen Marshall, made its world premiere with a sold-out run at the Signature Theatre in Washington, D.C., from December 9, 2014, to January 25, 2015. She remained part of the production and its extended run when it was staged by the Delaware Theatre Company in December 2015.

Henningsen made her Broadway debut as Fantine in the revival of Les Misérables on March 3, 2015. She has disclosed in interviews that she was about to file for unemployment when she learned she was cast as Fantine, which also happened to be the last role she played as an undergraduate at the University of Michigan, 11 months earlier. She is the youngest actress in Broadway history (to date) to portray the role of Fantine. She left the production along with fellow Les Misérables co-stars Ramin Karimloo and Samantha Hill on August 30, 2015, and was replaced by Memphis star Montego Glover.

In the summer of 2016, Henningsen portrayed Ensign Nellie Forbush, opposite Ben Davis, in the Pittsburgh Civic Light Opera's production of South Pacific.

In February 2017, she appeared in an Off-Broadway staged concert of Jerry Herman's musical Dear World as Nina with the York Theatre Company, starring alongside Tyne Daly, Alison Fraser, and Ann Harada.

Henningsen returned to the Pittsburgh Civic Light Opera (PCLO) in the summer of 2017, starring as Sophie in the company's regional production of Mamma Mia!. During her run at PCLO, it was announced that she was cast as Cady Heron in the upcoming Washington, D.C. production of Mean Girls.

Beginning in 2017, Henningsen starred as Cady Heron in the Tony Award-nominated Broadway musical Mean Girls, written by Tina Fey with music and lyrics by Jeff Richmond and Nell Benjamin, respectively. The show had its world premiere as an out-of-town tryout at the National Theatre in Washington, D.C., from October 31, 2017, to December 3, 2017, in which Henningsen originated the role of Cady Heron. She was later nominated for an Outer Critics Circle Award for this role. The musical, which is based on the film of the same name, began previews on March 12, 2018, and officially opened on Broadway on April 8, 2018, at the August Wilson Theatre in New York City. During the weeks surrounding the Broadway opening of Mean Girls, Henningsen filmed a series of video blogs for Broadway.com entitled "Too Grool for School: Backstage at Mean Girls with Erika Henningsen", giving viewers a look backstage and at events like opening night, the cast album recording, and the cast's appearance on The Today Show. Henningsen left the production on February 22, 2020, and was replaced by actress Sabrina Carpenter.

In March 2019, she portrayed Helen, opposite Mean Girls co-star Kyle Selig, in Stephen Sondheim's Saturday Night at Second Stage Theater as a part of the theater's "Musical Mondays" weekly concert series.

In January 2020, it was announced that Henningsen would be joining the Broadway cast of the new musical Flying Over Sunset, scheduled to open in the spring of 2020 at the Vivian Beaumont Theater under the direction of James Lapine. However, the production's opening was postponed until the fall of 2020 after theaters were mandated to shut down by Governor Andrew Cuomo on March 12, 2020, due to the COVID-19 pandemic. Henningsen did not return to the production when it resumed performances in December 2021.

In December 2022, Henningsen will star as Joy in the world premiere of the musical Joy at the George Street Playhouse in New Jersey.

Philanthropy and social activism
As a student at the University of Michigan, Henningsen was the co-president of the Michigan Performance Outreach Workshop (MPOW), a student-run organization (co-founded by her classmate and future Mean Girls co-star, Ashley Park) with the purpose of bringing performing-arts educational opportunities to students in southeastern Michigan to, "foster creative expression, build self-esteem, and strengthen the community." MPOW hosts an on-campus workshop each semester for 130-200 public-school students that includes performances by University of Michigan students as well as immersive and collaborative workshops in other arts-based disciplines.

Henningsen has actively been involved with Sing For Hope, a NYC-based non-profit organization dedicated to creating access to high-quality arts education and programming throughout New York City. She serves as an artist partner, teaches classes, and leads workshops with purpose of introducing and encouraging creative expression in NYC children with decreased access to the arts.

Henningsen has also participated in events supporting Artists Striving to End Poverty (ASTEP), Artists For Action NYC, Broadway Sings for Immigration Equality, and Broadway Cares/Equity Fights AIDS (BCEFA). In July 2018, she attended the 20th Broadway Barks, an annual event promoting the adoption of shelter animals. In December 2018, Henningsen participated in the second annual Broadway Beats Hunger concert, raising funds for the Summit Medical Group Foundation's "Food, Health and Hope: An Answer to Diabetes" initiative. She was a prominent advocate for the Actors' Equity Association's "Not a Lab Rat" campaign, petitioning for actors participating in developmental labs for new stage productions to have a higher minimum salary and also receive a share of the production's profits.

In April 2019, Henningsen partnered with the African Library Project to create a library for St. Catherine's School in Migori County, Kenya, a few hours away from where Cady Heron (her fictional character from Mean Girls) lived. She raised money to pay for shipping costs and collected new and used books donated at the stage door of the August Wilson Theatre. In just over a month, Henningsen received over 1,100 donated books and shipped the "library" to Migori County, Kenya.

She also has served as a mentor and held masterclasses for various programs and organizations, such as The Performing Arts Project, Broadway Method Academy, Broadway Workshop, Exit II Theater, and The Broadway Collective.

During the COVID-19 pandemic, Henningsen teamed up with She's the First, a non-profit organization committed to providing access to education to all girls, to raise money for their COVID-19 Response Fund by offering access to her exclusive living room concert with any donation amount on May 12, 2020. Her Zoom living room concert on May 15, 2020, raised over $4,000 for She's the First.

Personal life
Henningson has been in a relationship with Mean Girls costar Kyle Selig since 2017. The two announced their engagement on July 1, 2021.

Theatre credits 

•

Filmography

Film

Television

Discography

Cast recordings and soundtracks
 The Theory of Relativity – Original Cast Recording (2016)
 Mean Girls – Original Broadway Cast Recording (2018)
 Girls5eva (Music From the Peacock Original Series) (2021)

Collaborative projects
 Broadway's Carols for a Cure, Volume 17 (2015)
 Broadway's Carols for a Cure, Volume 20 (2018)

As featured artist
 "Rockin' Around the Pole" by The Hot Elves (2018)

Awards and nominations

Special honors and awards
 2014 – Alan Eisenberg Award Scholarship
 2018 – Broadway.com Star of the Year

References

External links
 Official website
 
 

1992 births
21st-century American actresses
Actresses from San Francisco
American musical theatre actresses
American stage actresses
Living people
University of Michigan School of Music, Theatre & Dance alumni